Phyllis Forbes Dennis (31 May 1884 – 22 August 1963) was a British novelist and short story writer.

Life and career
Bottome was born in 1882, in Rochester, Kent, the daughter of an American clergyman, Rev. William MacDonald Bottome, and an Englishwoman, Mary (Leatham) Bottome.

In 1901, following the death of her sister Wilmett of the same disease, Bottome was diagnosed with tuberculosis. She travelled to St Moritz in the hope that this would improve her health as mountain air was perceived as better for patients with tuberculosis.

In 1917, in Paris, she married Alban Ernan Forbes Dennis, a British diplomat working firstly in Marseilles and then in Vienna as Passport Control Officer, a cover for his real role as MI6 Head of Station with responsibility for Austria, Hungary and Yugoslavia.  They had met in 1904 at a villa in St Moritz, where Bottome was lodging. 

Bottome studied individual psychology under Alfred Adler while in Vienna.

In 1924 she and her husband started a school in Kitzbühel in Austria. Based on the teaching of languages, the school was intended to be a community and an educational laboratory to determine how psychology and educational theory could cure the ills of nations. One of their more famous pupils was Ian Fleming, author of the James Bond novels. In 1960, Fleming wrote to Bottome, "My life with you both is one of my most cherished memories, and heaven knows where I should be today without Ernan." It has been argued that Fleming took the idea of James Bond from the character Mark Chalmers in Bottome's spy novel The Lifeline.

In 1935, her novel Private Worlds was made into a film of the same title. Set in a psychiatric clinic, Bottome's knowledge of individual psychology proved useful in creating a realistic scene. Bottome saw her share of trouble with Danger Signal, which the Hays Office forbade from becoming a Hollywood film. Germany became Bottome's home in the late 1930s, and it inspired her novel The Mortal Storm, the film of which was the first to mention Hitler's name and be set in Nazi Germany. Bottome was an active anti-fascist.

In total, four of her works—Private Worlds, The Mortal Storm,  Danger Signal, and The Heart of a Child—were adapted to film. In addition to fiction, she is also known as an Adlerian who wrote a biography of Alfred Adler.

Bottome died in London on 22 August 1963. Forbes Dennis would die in July 1972 in Brighton.

There is a large collection of her literary papers and correspondence in the British Library acquired in 2000 (Add MSS 78832-78903). A second tranche, consisting of correspondence and literary manuscripts, was acquired by the British Library in 2005. The British Library also holds the Phyllis Bottome/Hodder-Salmon Papers consisting of correspondence, papers and press cuttings relating to Bottome.

Books 
She wrote her first novel when she was just seventeen.
 The Dark Tower, 1916
 The Second Fiddle, 1917
 The Derelict, 1917 (U.S.), 1923 (U.K.)
 A Servant of Reality, 1919
 Kingfisher, 1922
 The Perfect Wife, 1924
 Life of Olive Schreiner, 1924
 Old Wine, 1925
 The Belated Reckoning, 1926
 The Messenger of the Gods — The Story of a Girl of Today, 1927, George H. Doran Company
 Strange Fruit: Stories, 1928
 Windlestraws, 1929
 The Advances of Harriet, 1933
 Private Worlds, 1934
 Level Crossing, 1936
 The Mortal Storm, Oct 1937
 Alfred Adler – Apostle of Freedom. London 1939, Faber & Faber, 3rd Ed. 1957
 Danger Signal, 1939 (original title: Murder in the Bud)
 Masks and Faces, 1940
 Formidable to Tyrants, 1941
 London Pride, 1941. A boy's experience of the Blitz and the Second World War. His family are separated by evacuation and a bombing raid destroys their home. After another raid he is injured and evacuated away from London.
 Mansion House of Liberty, 1941
 Heart of a Child, 1942
 Within the Cup, 1943
 Survival, 1943
 From the Life, 1944, London, Faber & Faber. Six studies of the author's friends Alfred Adler, Max Beerbohm, Ivor Novello, Sara Delano Roosevelt, Ezra Pound, Margaret MacDonald Bottome.
 The Lifeline, 1946
 Innocence and Experience, 1947
 Search for a Soul, 1947
 Fortune's Finger, 1950
 Under the Skin – Love Drew no Color Line when a White Woman entered a Negro's World, 1950
 The Challenge, 1953
 The Secret Stair, 1954
 Against Whom? 1954. By chance a patient is brought to a sanatorium on the verge of death. How he not only recovers but manages to influence the lives of the scientists who have observed him is the subject of this novel. In the course of the book the principal characters find either that they must think of others and put that thought into practise or that those same 'others' will become their enemy and destroy, one by one, his most intimate relationships.
 Eldorado Jane, 1956
 Walls of Glass, 1958
 The Goal, 1962 – her autobiography
 Our New Order or Hitler's? A Selection of Speeches by Winston Churchill, Archbishop of Canterbury, Anthony Eden & Others, ed. by Ph. Bottome, Penguin Books Middlesex 1943

References

Further reading
 Pam Hirsch: The Constant Liberal – The life and work of Phyllis Bottome, Quartet Books 2010, 
 Woman out of time an essay on Phyllis Bottome by Andrea Crawford
 The Times: Phyllis Bottome, protest novelist
 Orlando, Cambridge: Women’s Writing in the British Isles

External links

 
 
 
 Works at Open Library
 

1880s births
1963 deaths
20th-century English women writers
20th-century English novelists
20th-century British short story writers
British women short story writers
Founders of educational institutions
English people of American descent
English short story writers
English women novelists
Language teachers
People from Rochester, Kent